Joaquín Bilbao Martínez (August 27, 1864January 30, 1934) was a Spanish sculptor. The equestrian statue of Ferdinand III of Castile in the Plaza Nueva, Seville, opposite the Town Hall, was sculpted by him.

Early life

Joaquín Bilbao was born on August 27, 1864, in Sevilla. He was the brother of the painter Gonzalo Bilbao.

He studied Baccalaureate at the Provincial Institute. During his high school education, he enrolled with his brother Gonzalo in drawing and watercolor classes under Professor Pedro Vega. In 1881, upon finishing the Baccalaureate, he enrolled in the Faculty of Law of the old Literary University of Seville. He finished his law studies in 1887. In 1890, he started working at the law firm of Manuel de Bedmar y Escudero. At the age of 29 he left the legal profession to devote himself to sculpture.

Career
In 1900 Bilbao moved to Paris, where he attended his  for four years. During that time, he also made trips to Belgium, Netherlands, Germany, and England. In Netherlands and Belgium, he learned from the work of Constantin Meunier. He returned to Seville in 1904. In October of that year, the  named Bilbao as a member of Sculpture of the Provincial Commission of Historical and Artistic Monuments.

In 1909 he moved to Toledo and became professor at the School of Arts and Crafts of Toledo. In 1902 he was appointed Ordinary Commander of the Civil Order of Alfonso XII. In 1912 he returned to his hometown, where he remained, except for sporadic trips.

From 1914 to 1919 he had a disciple in his workshop Enrique Pérez Comendador, who made a bronze bust of his teacher.

Bilbao died on January 30, 1934, in Seville.

List of selected works
His works include:

Drawing and paintings

Sculptures

Literature

Notes

References

External links

 

1864 births
1934 deaths
University of Seville alumni
People from Seville
19th-century sculptors
Spanish sculptors